Athenree is a rural settlement coastal town in the Western Bay of Plenty District of New Zealand. It is on the northern side of Tauranga Harbour, and separated from Waihi Beach by the Waiau River on its north and east side.

The area includes a holiday park with hot springs and Athenree Wetland, which includes a walking track.

The settlement was named for Athenry in Country Galway, Ireland by settlers arriving in 1878, including Captain Hugh Stewart (a brother of George Vesey Stewart) and his wife, Adela Blanche Stewart, who wrote a book about her experiences called My Simple Life in New Zealand. The settlement was initially successful due to the 1878 opening of the Martha gold mine in Waihi, and later because of dairy farming.

Demographics

Athenree had a population of 804 at the 2018 New Zealand census, an increase of 129 people (19.1%) since the 2013 census, and an increase of 192 people (31.4%) since the 2006 census. There were 291 households, comprising 381 males and 426 females, giving a sex ratio of 0.89 males per female. The median age was 55.2 years (compared with 37.4 years nationally), with 123 people (15.3%) aged under 15 years, 84 (10.4%) aged 15 to 29, 342 (42.5%) aged 30 to 64, and 258 (32.1%) aged 65 or older.

Ethnicities were 92.2% European/Pākehā, 13.8% Māori, 1.1% Pacific peoples, 1.5% Asian, and 2.2% other ethnicities. People may identify with more than one ethnicity.

The percentage of people born overseas was 20.1, compared with 27.1% nationally.

Although some people chose not to answer the census's question about religious affiliation, 56.3% had no religion, 34.7% were Christian, 0.7% had Māori religious beliefs and 1.9% had other religions.

Of those at least 15 years old, 129 (18.9%) people had a bachelor's or higher degree, and 126 (18.5%) people had no formal qualifications. The median income was $26,500, compared with $31,800 nationally. 81 people (11.9%) earned over $70,000 compared to 17.2% nationally. The employment status of those at least 15 was that 246 (36.1%) people were employed full-time, 120 (17.6%) were part-time, and 27 (4.0%) were unemployed.

References

Western Bay of Plenty District
Populated places in the Bay of Plenty Region
Populated places around the Tauranga Harbour